Anchiale or Anchialeia was a historic city of ancient Cilicia now a part of modern Mersin, Turkey. It was inhabited during the Hellenistic, Roman, and Byzantine eras.

History
The main informant about Anchiale was Strabo. According to Strabo the city had been constructed by Sardanapalus, the last king of Assyria. Strabo further claims that Sardanapalus' tomb is in Anchiale. The city was conquered by Alexander the Great just before the battle of Issus.

Geography
The exact location of Anchiale is debatable. But he adds that the amount of ruins in Karaduvar is too few for an important ancient city.

Ruins
As Beaufort points out there are only a few ruins. There are a tumulus, several house ruins and an aqueduct from the original city. Bath mosaic is from Roman times.

References

Archaeological sites in Mersin Province, Turkey
Former populated places in Turkey
Ancient Greek archaeological sites in Turkey
Roman towns and cities in Turkey
Populated places of the Byzantine Empire
Akdeniz District